The 1965 U.S. Women's Open was the 20th U.S. Women's Open, held July 1–4 at Atlantic City Country Club in Northfield, New Jersey.

Carol Mann, age 24, won her only U.S. Women's Open, two strokes ahead of runner-up Kathy Cornelius, the 1956 champion. It was the second of Mann's two major championships, who had an opening round of 78 (+6); at the 72nd hole on Sunday, she needed a par to win and made a birdie.

This was the first U.S. Women's Open scheduled for four days since 1952, with the final round on Sunday. From 1953 through 1964, the third and fourth rounds were both played on Saturday; the U.S. Open also moved its final round to Sunday in 1965. The purse was substantially increased, with a winner's share of $4,000, up from $2,200 in 1964.

Defending champion Mickey Wright, a four-time winner, had an injury to her left hand and did not compete.

The course previously hosted the championship in 1948 and it returned in 1975.

Past champions in the field

Source:
 Mickey Wright (1958, 1959, 1961 1964) withdrew the night before the first round, due to injury.

Final leaderboard
Sunday, July 4, 1965

Source:

References

External links
Golf Observer final leaderboard
U.S. Women's Open Golf Championship
U.S. Women's Open – past champions – 1965
Atlantic City Country Club

U.S. Women's Open
Golf in New Jersey
Sports competitions in New Jersey
U.S. Women's Open
U.S. Women's Open
U.S. Women's Open
U.S. Women's Open
Women's sports in New Jersey